Miguel Ángel Pinto Jerez (born July 4, 1983) is a Chilean football goalkeeper who plays for Chilean club Coquimbo Unido.

Club career

Universidad de Chile
Pinto was born in Santiago, Chile, and was thrust into action in 2002 against Universidad de Chile's biggest rival, Colo-Colo, when the team's first string goalkeeper was injured and the second string goalkeeper was ejected in the same game.  In his first action against Colo-Colo he would hold them scoreless, which would foreshadow his future success against the same team.  Pinto would be the team's second team goalkeeper for the 2003, 2004 and 2005 season behind Johnny Herrera.  Herrera was transferred to Corinthians in 2006 pushing Pinto to become the team's first-choice goalkeeper a position he has held for three years.  In 2006 Pinto drew some criticism for his low level of performance.  However, in 2007 Pinto was named the best player of the year for Universidad de Chile.  After a successful 2008 season, Universidad de Chile qualified for the preliminary round of the Copa Libertadores 2009, which would lead to Pinto's first participation in international club football.  Universidad de Chile would go on to defeat Pachuca in the preliminary round with Pinto turning in good performances in both games of the two-legged playoff.  In the group stage, Pinto would have an incredible performance against Gremio in Porto Alegre making numerous saves in order to maintain a scoreless draw.  In the game Pinto received 25 shots from the Brazilian side.  Pinto would go on to play in 10 games during the tournament allowing 11 goals, which has led to rumors that Pinto will be making a move to a Mexican club Cruz Azul in mid-2009 for a reported $1.2 million.  Pinto won his first title with Universidad de Chile at the end of the Apertura Tournament 2009. In December 2010 after being eliminated of the "Liguilla" for Copa Libertadores 2011 the president of Universidad de Chile Federico Valdés confirmed the transfer of the player to the Mexican club Atlas, in where he will play on loan from La U.

All-time club statistics

America = Sudamericana y Libertadores

International career
Pinto represented Chile in the South American Youth Championship of 2003, which is a Sub-20 tournament.  In 2006 Pinto made appearances for the adult side against Ivory Coast and Ireland. Former Chile national coach Nelson Acosta named Pinto  as the third goalkeeper for the Copa America 2007 tournament.  However Pinto refused to be the third goalkeeper and did not make the trip to Venezuela.  In 2007, Argentine coach Marcelo Bielsa took over the Chile national team and he regularly names Pinto as the second goalkeeper behind Claudio Bravo.  In May 2009, Pinto along with Chile participated in the Kirin Cup and in two games Pinto allowed five goals.

Personal life
Pinto designs his own goalkeeper jersey, such as former goalkeeper Jose Luis Chilavert. Pinto regularly incorporates a lion or owl into his designs, which are the mascots of Universidad de Chile.  

His older brother, is a former professional football goalkeeper who made an appearance for the Chile national team. Pinto also has a twin brother named Juan Francisco.  

Pinto is also known by his nicknames, Miguelito and Criptonita (kryptonite).

He holds Mexican citizenship.

Honours

Club
Universidad de Chile
 Primera División de Chile (2): 2004 Apertura, 2009 Apertura

Individual
 America best goalkeeper: 2009
 Copa Sudamericana best goalkeeper (1): 2009

References

External links

 

1983 births
Living people
Footballers from Santiago
Chilean footballers
Chile international footballers
Universidad de Chile footballers
Atlas F.C. footballers
Correcaminos UAT footballers
Cafetaleros de Chiapas footballers
O'Higgins F.C. footballers
Colo-Colo footballers
Unión Española footballers
Coquimbo Unido footballers
Association football goalkeepers
Chilean Primera División players
Liga MX players
Ascenso MX players
Chilean expatriate footballers
Chilean expatriate sportspeople in Mexico
Expatriate footballers in Mexico
2010 FIFA World Cup players
2011 Copa América players
Chilean twins
Twin sportspeople
Naturalized citizens of Mexico